Celaenaclystis is a genus of moth in the family Geometridae.

Species
Celaenaclystis celaenacris (Prout, 1932)
Celaenaclystis telygeta (Prout, 1932)

References

External links
Natural History Museum Lepidoptera genus database

Eupitheciini